Pavlina Khristova (born 6 October 1968) is a Bulgarian rower. She competed in the women's quadruple sculls event at the 1988 Summer Olympics.

References

1968 births
Living people
Bulgarian female rowers
Olympic rowers of Bulgaria
Rowers at the 1988 Summer Olympics
People from Targovishte